HLA class II histocompatibility antigen gamma chain also known as HLA-DR antigens-associated invariant chain or CD74 (Cluster of Differentiation 74), is a protein that in humans is encoded by the CD74 gene. The invariant chain (Abbreviated Ii) is a polypeptide which plays a critical role in antigen presentation. It is involved in the formation and transport of MHC class II peptide complexes for the generation of CD4+ T cell responses. The cell surface form of the invariant chain is known as CD74. CD74 is a cell surface receptor for the cytokine macrophage migration inhibitory factor (MIF).

Function 
The nascent MHC class II protein in the rough endoplasmic reticulum (RER) binds a segment of the invariant chain (Ii; a trimer) in order to shape the peptide-binding groove and prevent the formation of a closed conformation.

The invariant chain also facilitates the export of MHC class II from the RER in a vesicle. The signal for endosomal targeting resides in the cytoplasmic tail of the invariant chain. This fuses with a late endosome containing the endocytosed antigen proteins (from the exogenous pathway). Binding to Ii ensures that no antigen peptides from the endogenous pathway meant for MHC class I molecules accidentally bind to the groove of MHC class II molecules. The Ii is then cleaved by cathepsin S (cathepsin L in cortical thymic epithelial cells), leaving only a small fragment called CLIP remaining bound to the groove of MHC class II molecules. The rest of the Ii is degraded. CLIP blocks peptide-binding until HLA-DM interacts with MHC II, releasing CLIP and allowing other peptides to bind. In some cases, CLIP dissociates without any further molecular interactions, but in other cases the binding to the MHC is more stable.

The stable MHC class II + antigen complex is then presented on the cell surface. Without CLIP, MHC class II aggregates disassemble and/or denature in the endosomes, and proper antigen presentation is impaired.

Clinical significance

Vaccine adjuvant
The Ii molecule—fused with a viral vector to a conserved region of the Hepatitis C virus (HCV) genome—has been tested as an adjuvant for a HCV vaccine in a cohort of 17 healthy human volunteers. This experimental vaccine was well-tolerated, and those who received the adjuvanted vaccine had stronger anti-HCV immune responses (enhanced magnitude, breadth and proliferative capacity of anti-HCV-specific T-cells) compared with volunteers who received the vaccine that lacked the Ii adjuvant.

The Ii molecule might also prove to be useful as an adjuvant for a future vaccine for the SARS-CoV-2 virus, if this enhancing effect can be demonstrated to apply to the appropriate antigen(s).

Cancer
Found on a number of cancer cell types. Possible cancer therapy target. See milatuzumab.

Axial spondyloarthritis
Autoantibodies against CD74 have been identified as promising biomarkers in the early diagnosis of the autoimmune disease called axial spondyloarthritis (non-radiographic axial spondyloarthritis and radiographic axial spondyloarthritis / Ankylosing spondylitis).

Interactions 

CD74 receptor interacts with the cytokine Macrophage migration inhibitory factor (MIF) to mediate some of its functions.

Recovery functions

CD74 receptor is expressed on the surface of different cell types. Interaction between MIF cytokine and its cell membrane receptor CD74 activates pro-survival and proliferative pathways that protect against injury and promote healing in different parts of the body.

History 
The invariant chain was first described by Patricia P. Jones, Donal B. Murphy, Derek Hewgill, and Hugh McDevitt at Stanford. The nomenclature "Ii" comes from an Ix-based naming system (I for Immune) that predates the naming of the Major Histocompatibility Complex.

See also 
 Cluster of differentiation
Milatuzumab the first Mab to target CD74

References

Further reading

External links 
 
 Overview at Davidson College (student generated)
 School of Crystallography The Invariant Chain
 

Clusters of differentiation
Immune system